The Pentagon Memorial, formally the National 9/11 Pentagon Memorial, located just southwest of the Pentagon in Arlington County, Virginia, across the Potomac River from Washington, D.C., is a permanent outdoor memorial to the 184 people who died as victims in the building and on American Airlines Flight 77 during the September 11 attacks.

Designed by Julie Beckman and Keith Kaseman of the architectural firm of Kaseman Beckman Advanced Strategies with engineers Buro Happold, the memorial opened on September 11, 2008, seven years after the attack.

Early memorials

In the aftermath of the 9/11 attacks, an impromptu memorial was set up on a hill at the Navy Annex, overlooking the Pentagon.  People came to pay respects and place tributes.  One month after the attacks, 25,000 people attended a memorial service at the Pentagon for employees and family members; speakers included President George W. Bush and Secretary of Defense Donald Rumsfeld.  Bush remarked, "The wound to this building will not be forgotten, but it will be repaired. Brick by brick, we will quickly rebuild the Pentagon."  The American flag that hung on the Pentagon, near the damaged section, was lowered during the service.

Victims of Terrorist Attack on the Pentagon Memorial

On September 12, 2002, the day after the first anniversary of the attacks, Defense Secretary Donald Rumsfeld and General Richard Myers, chairman of the Joint Chiefs of Staff, dedicated the Victims of Terrorist Attack on the Pentagon Memorial at Arlington National Cemetery. A portion of the remains of 25 other victims are buried at the site. Around the top is inscribed "Victims of Terrorist Attack on the Pentagon September 11, 2001". Aluminum plaques, painted black, are inscribed with the names of the 184 victims.

America's Heroes Memorial

Opened in September 2002 after Pentagon repairs were completed, the Americas Heroes Memorial and chapel are located where American Airlines Flight 77 crashed into the building.

The memorial includes a book of photographs and biographies of the victims. It also includes five large black acrylic panels: one displays the Purple Heart medal awarded to military members killed in the attacks, another shows the medal given to civilians, two back wall panels are etched with the victims' names, and a center panel shows tribute statements.  The small chapel, located in an adjacent room, has stained glass windows with patriotic-themed designs.

Design and construction

The Pentagon Memorial was constructed from a design by Julie Beckman and Keith Kaseman of Philadelphia, Pennsylvania, with design support from Buro Happold and [Delta Fountains], that was chosen following a design competition. The design competition included a group of 11 judges, including Terence Riley, the chief curator of architecture and design at the Museum of Modern Art, and two former secretaries of defense, Melvin Laird and Harold Brown. They viewed 1,126 memorial proposals from around the world. Of the six international finalists selected, all were designers: Jean Koeppel and Tom Kowalski, Mason Wickham and Edwin Zawadzki, Jacky Bowring, Shane Williamson, Michael Meredith, and Julie Beckman and Keith Kaseman.

The design by Beckman and Kaseman consisted of 184 illuminated benches, arranged according to the victims' ages, starting with Dana Falkenberg, age 3, to John Yamnicky Sr., age 71, in a landscaped  plot. Each bench is engraved with the name of a victim. The benches representing the victims that were inside the Pentagon are arranged so those reading the names will face the Pentagon's south facade, where the plane hit; benches dedicated to victims aboard the plane are arranged so that those reading the engraved name will be facing skyward along the path the plane traveled. A shallow lighted pool of flowing water is positioned under each memorial bench. If more than one member of a family died during the attack, family names are listed in the reflecting pool under the bench, in addition to the separate benches that have been created for each individual.

A wall along the edge of the Memorial begins at a height of 3 inches (7.6 cm) and rises to a height of 71 inches (180 cm), the ages of the youngest and oldest victim of the attack, and about 85 crepe myrtle trees are planted on the memorial grounds.

Funding of $13.8 million had been raised for construction of the memorial by May 2007. Donations include $250,000 from American Forests towards planting trees at the memorial, and $1 million from the government of Taiwan.

Construction began on June 15, 2006. By November 2006, site excavation, re-routing of existing utility lines had been completed, and water lines laid for the fountain pools.  By May 2007, the foundation of the perimeter wall was built and concrete pilings poured for each bench.

Dedication ceremony

The Memorial was dedicated and opened to the public on September 11, 2008. President George W. Bush called the memorial "an everlasting tribute to the 184 souls who perished." Over 20,000 people attended the dedication ceremony, including past Secretary of Defense Donald Rumsfeld, Chairman of the Joint Chiefs of Staff Michael Mullen, and Secretary of Defense Robert M. Gates. It was opened to the public at 7 p.m. in a separate ceremony with a music performance by the Navy Band and the Sea Chanters Chorus. SFC Peter George Lentz unveiled the first bench.

Operations

The Memorial is open seven days a week, year-round. It is also the only place on the Pentagon grounds where photography by the public is permitted.

As of August 2011, the memorial had received an annual average of 225,000 to 250,000 visitors.

Anniversary events
To commemorate the anniversary each year, an American flag is hung on the section of the Pentagon hit by Flight 77.  At night, this section of the building is lit up in blue lights.  For the fifth anniversary, a "Tribute of Lights" display included 184 beams of light from the center courtyard shining into the sky.

Anniversary events also include the America Supports You National Freedom Walk, which has been held on Sundays.  The walk starts at the Lincoln Memorial and ends at the Pentagon.  The Arlington Police/Fire/Sheriff 5K Race is held on Saturdays, around the anniversary, with the course going through part of Crystal City and through the Pentagon grounds.

Memorial services are held on the anniversary of 9/11 at the Pentagon, with one service in an auditorium at the Pentagon for employees.  A smaller service is held at the memorial site for family and friends of victims killed at the Pentagon on 9/11.

Gallery

See also
Memorials and services for the September 11 attacks
Flight 93 National Memorial, Shanksville, Pennsylvania
National September 11 Memorial & Museum, New York City
One World Trade Center, New York City
List of national memorials of the United States

References

External links

Pentagon Memorial Website
CNN Story on Pentagon Memorial Design Competition
From the Inside Out: Sept. 11 Memorialized - DefenseLINK News
List of victims in the Pentagon 
List of victims on American Airlines Flight 77
Overview of Reflecting Pools and Benches

Monuments and memorials in Virginia
Memorials for the September 11 attacks
Memorial